6060 aluminium alloy is an alloy in the wrought aluminium-magnesium-silicon family (6000 or 6xxx series). It is much more closely related to the alloy 6063 than to 6061. The main difference between 6060 and 6063 is that 6063 has a slightly higher magnesium content. It can be formed by extrusion, forging or rolling, but as a wrought alloy it is not used in casting. It cannot be work hardened, but is commonly heat treated to produce tempers with a higher strength but lower ductility.

Alternate names and designations include AlMgSi, 3.3206, and A96060. The alloy and its various tempers are covered by the following standards:

 ASTM B 221: Standard Specification for Aluminum and Aluminum-Alloy Extruded Bars, Rods, Wire, Profiles, and Tubes
 EN 573-3: Aluminium and aluminium alloys. Chemical composition and form of wrought products. Chemical composition and form of products
 EN 754-2: Aluminium and aluminium alloys. Cold drawn rod/bar and tube. Mechanical properties
 EN 755-2: Aluminium and aluminium alloys. Extruded rod/bar, tube and profiles. Mechanical properties
 ISO 6361: Wrought Aluminium and Aluminium Alloy Sheets, Strips and Plates

Chemical composition

The alloy composition of 6060 aluminium is:

 Aluminium: 97.9 to 99.3%
 Chromium: 0.05% max
 Copper: 0.1% max
 Iron: 0.1 to 0.3%
 Magnesium: 0.35 to 0.5%
 Manganese: 0.10%
 Silicon: 0.3 to 0.6%
 Titanium: 0.1% max
 Zinc: 0.15% max
 Residuals: 0.15% max

Properties

Typical material properties for 6060 aluminum alloy include:

 Density: 2.710 g/cm3, or 169 lb/ft3.
 Young's modulus: 70 GPa, or 10 Msi, or 303 EMEC 
 Ultimate tensile strength: 140 to 230 MPa, or 20 to 33 ksi.
 Yield strength: 70 to 180 MPa, or 10 to 26 ksi.
 Thermal Expansion: 23.4 μm/m-K.
 Solidus: 610 °C or 1130 °F.

References

Aluminum alloy table 

Aluminium alloys
Aluminium–magnesium–silicon alloys